Some Heavy Ocean is the first official studio album by American singer-songwriter Emma Ruth Rundle, released on May 20, 2014 by Sargent House. Writing for the album took place between summer 2012 and 2013. The record was co-produced by Rundle and labelmate Chris Common, with recording completed at Sargent House's in-home studio. Rundle has named "Living With the Black Dog" as her favorite track on the record. The track "Oh Sarah" was said to be the first track written for the record.

Track listing

Personnel
Some Heavy Ocean album personnel adapted from AllMusic.

Emma Ruth Rundle - vocals, bass guitar, flute, guitar, keyboards, production, composition
Andrea Calderon - strings, vocals, string arranging
Chris Common - bass guitar, drums, keyboards, percussion, vocals, engineering, mixing, production 
Greg Burns - pedal steel guitar, photography
Henry Kohen - additional guitar on "Shadows of My Name"
Marty Rifkin - mastering, mixing
Sonny Kay - layout

References

External links

2014 debut albums
Emma Ruth Rundle albums
Sargent House albums